Jai Paul is an English songwriter, record producer and recording artist. His early demo "BTSTU" led to his online discovery and a subsequent recording contract with XL Recordings. Together with its follow-up "Jasmine", these songs have been regarded as influential on underground as well as mainstream pop music in the 2010s. A demo album consisting of songs for his aborted debut album Bait Ones was leaked in 2013 and unofficially uploaded by an unknown source to the surprise and acclaim of critics, leading to Paul taking an extended hiatus from music. Paul returned in 2019 with the official release of his leaked album and a new double single entitled "Do You Love Her Now / He".

Early life
Paul is from Rayners Lane in Harrow, northwest London, England. He is of Indian descent.

Music career

2007–2013: "BTSTU" and "Jasmine"

Paul's 2007 demo recording "BTSTU", hosted at his MySpace page, received widespread music blog coverage throughout 2010, resulting in UK national radio play. International music press followed blog coverage of the track (with some publications shortening the song's title to "BTSU"). The song caught the attention of several record companies and a bidding war ensued, with Paul eventually signing with XL Recordings later that year. By December 2010, the BBC had long-listed Paul for their Sound of 2011 poll, asserting his style as "a startlingly fresh vision of 21st century pop music".

On 21 April 2011, XL Recordings officially released Paul's the reworked "BTSTU (Edit)" to acclaim, with the BBC's Zane Lowe commenting that "Jai (pronounced Jay) Paul is part Dilla / part D'Angelo but also full of individuality. An exciting prospect on the horizon." On 20 May 2011, Canadian hip-hop artist Drake "officially leaked" a track titled "Dreams Money Can Buy" via his blog, October's Very Own. Shortly afterward, "End of Time", a song by American R&B artist Beyoncé, surfaced online. Both tracks feature a sample of Paul's "BTSTU".

On 30 March 2012, Paul uploaded a new demo titled "Jasmine (demo)" to his official SoundCloud page, subsequently receiving an official release via XL on 9 April 2012. "Jasmine (demo)" received positive reviews, with Pitchfork featuring the song as a "Best New Track", The New York Times praising its "Prince era sensuality" and The Guardian describing the production as "amazing".

Later in 2012, Paul appeared as a guest on the deluxe version of Big Boi's 2012 album Vicious Lies and Dangerous Rumors, having produced the track "Higher Res". Paul was also featured on the track alongside Big Boi and Little Dragon.

2013–2016: Leaked material, hiatus from music
On 14 April 2013, an unknown user uploaded a number of untitled tracks to Bandcamp, a music streaming and purchasing service that caters mainly for independent artists (artists without a record label). These untitled tracks were made available for sale as an album. Bandcamp is known for being vulnerable to scams and copyright infringement, with Consequence of Sound reporting in a feature that "Its response time to infractions is slow, and its built-in protections against scams appear minimal." However, hours after the page's appearance, music press picked up on it and publicised it extensively, reporting the music as belonging to Paul and describing it as constituting his debut album, as well as including links to download the material in articles. Paul and his record label denied having released the recordings, or authorising their release.

Owen Myers reported the music as having come from a personal laptop stolen from Paul himself, citing a comment made by Twitter user "@FatAmpNadia" as his source. Major music press followed Myers' lead, and the stolen laptop story was universally reported. It is unclear how "@FatAmpNadia" is involved.

Many journalists and commenters suggested the leak to be a cynically devised marketing plan on Paul and XL Recordings' behalf; having achieved the desired result, the two parties made false statements to the public "explaining away" the events. Others conjectured that Paul did in fact upload the tracks himself, in an attempt to illegally leak and sell his music independently from record label XL Recordings and publisher BMG, seeing parallels with distinct situations involving unrelated artists. Duncan Cooper of The Fader concludes that "In any case, the album's origins and  seem like something of a technicality", adding the opinion that "Jai Paul seems to be getting paid for it", despite the record company's claims otherwise.

Many publications opted to review the leaked material as an "album" with Gigwise commenting "there are moments that sound distinctly unfinished. There are periods of silence at the end of most tracks, there're only a few smooth segues between the skits and the tracks, and there are periods where the mixing of the vocal track sounds downright bad. The whole album doesn't feel as precisely balanced as you would expect from Jai Paul."

Despite being an unofficial release, the "album" was ranked in year-end lists, at number 32 in the music blog Pretty Much Amazings "40 Best Albums of 2013", number 28 in The Guardians "Best Albums of 2013", and number 20 in Pitchforks "Top 50 Albums of 2013". In August 2014, Pitchfork recognised the leak in its "The 100 Best Albums of the Decade So Far" list. Formal release of the leaked material, Leak 04-13 (Bait Ones) (2019), was ranked number 95 in the publication's 200 Best albums of the 2010s.

2016–2019: Paul Institute
In March 2016, Jai and his brother A. K. Paul announced a new project titled Paul Institute. The project was inaugurated with the release of A. K. Paul's debut single as a solo artist, "Landcruisin'".

In November 2017, Jai was pictured for the first time since 2013 in Property Week, in which himself and A. K. Paul had signed a lease in London's White City Place for a space for the Paul Institute. Later that month, Paul Institute released two new singles; "Mystery" by Fabiana Palladino, with production credits to Jai Paul, and "Evil" by Ruthven, with production credits to A. K. Paul.

On 25 July 2018, The Institute released two new singles: the track "Shimmer" by Fabiana Palladino featuring Jai Paul on production, engineering, instrumental and mixing duties; and "Hypothalamus", Ruthven's second release on the Paul Institute imprint, featuring A. K. Paul on guitar.

2019–present: Return from hiatus and release of leaked material
In 2019, the leak was made official and digitally available as Leak 04-13 (Bait Ones) to his website and streaming services. The download included a long letter by Paul where he writes about how the music probably got leaked: "I don't really know. I believe these particular versions of tracks may have come from a burned CD that got misplaced - a fair amount of people would have had access to my music in various forms between 2010 and 2013." In the same letter, Paul also addresses the speculation about leaking the music himself: "I was also frustrated by how all this was being framed online, leading to the widespread belief that I had decided to leak my own music, despite my record label and I saying otherwise. It didn't fit at all with anything I had done previously in style or attitude, and especially not in presentation."

He also released two new singles, "He" and "Do You Love Her Now", as a double B-side to the Bait Ones album. This marked Paul's return from a hiatus of more than seven years after the release of his last single, "Jasmine". Paul provided miscellaneous production to the Childish Gambino's track "Time" featuring Ariana Grande on the album 3.15.20, released in March 2020.

On 20 April 2021, Paul posted on Twitter and Instagram in honor of the ten year anniversary of his first single, "BTSTU". In his posts he linked fans to a new site, a recreation of his old MySpace account, the platform he originally released music on. The site featured some unreleased demo and promotional material, as well as Easter egg content that linked to videos and websites.

In 2022, Paul made a brief appearance in the third season of the television series Atlanta, conversing with LaKeith Stanfield's character, Darius, at a party.

On 10 January 2023, Paul was announced as part of the Coachella lineup, which will serve as his first-ever live performance.

Relationship with media and industry
Music media has speculated about Paul's background, motivation and intent as he has remained out of the public eye, and his professional music career has not followed convention thus far. English publication Clash noted Paul's distinctiveness early on, saying in 2011: "Hype is a fascinating commodity. Where some quickly melt down the attention for liquid purpose, promising talent Jai Paul removed all his music from MySpace and went to get his shit together". XL Recordings founder and owner Richard Russell accepts Paul's idiosyncratic style, saying: "Jai is a wizard... the way he's going about things is, I think for many, baffling. He's going about things in the most Jai Paul way you could possibly go about things. And who knows where that may lead."

The Guardian writer Michael Cragg, having met Paul in 2011, observes that Paul's enigma "seems genuinely uncontrived – Jai just doesn't seem into the idea of rushing or teasing new material if it isn't ready." In a separate piece for i-D, Cragg goes on to say: "there was something incredibly charming about his confusion as to why anyone would want to talk to him. Weirdly, he was under the impression he could just release music for people to enjoy and that would be that." Pitchforks Lindsay Zoladz suggests that Paul may be "perhaps more burdened by his talent than inclined to show it off." Meanwhile, The Quietus blogger Alex Macpherson disagrees, presuming the opposite; saying Paul's "career to date [consists] of little more than a couple of shonky demos and a carefully cultivated aura of mystique" in a scathing article titled "Jai Paul: A Scam to Feed the Internet Sausage Machine".

In 2016, Rolling Stone magazine asked singer Nao (who has collaborated with A. K. Paul) whether the Paul brothers' image was intentionally "mysterious". She answered in the negative, saying: "They're not tapped into the industry in that way and I don't know if they give a shit." She added: "They're normal guys that are trying to find their own route without playing the game."

Discography

Albums
 Leak 04-13 (Bait Ones) (2019)

Singles

Guest appearances

Songwriting and production credits

References

External links
 
 
 
 guardian.co.uk New Band of the Day – Jai Paul (No. 782)
 Pitchfork: Forkcast: Jai Paul – BTSTU

English electronic musicians
Musicians from London
Living people
People from the London Borough of Harrow
XL Recordings artists
English people of Indian descent
Desi musicians
1989 births